Paola Pivi (born 1971) is an Italian multimedia artist.

She has worked in artistic media including photography, sculpture and installation. Some of her works contain performance elements, at times involving live animals and people. In 1999, she received the Golden Lion Award at the Venice Biennale. Examples of her work are in public collections including those of the Centre Pompidou in Paris and MAXXI in Rome.

References 

1971 births
Living people
20th-century Italian women artists
21st-century Italian women artists
Italian contemporary artists
Brera Academy alumni
Artists from Milan